Lillesand is municipality in Agder county, Norway. It is part of the traditional district of Sørlandet. The administrative center of the municipality is the town of Lillesand. Some of the larger villages in Lillesand municipality include Åkerøyhamn, Brekkestø, Gamle Hellesund, Helldal, Høvåg, Ribe, Skottevik, Trøe, Ulvøysund, and Vesterhus.

The  municipality is the 306th largest by area out of the 356 municipalities in Norway. Lillesand is the 101st most populous municipality in Norway with a population of 11,279.

General information

 
The town of Lillesand was established as a municipality on 1 January 1838 (see formannskapsdistrikt law). 
During the 1960s, there were many municipal mergers across Norway due to the work of the Schei Committee. On 1 January 1962, the following areas were merged into a new, larger municipality of Lillesand:
the town of Lillesand (population: 1,041)
the rural municipality of Høvåg (population: 1,330)
the rural municipality of Vestre Moland (population: 2,454)
the Gitmarkgårdene area of Eide municipality (population: 22)

Name
The Old Norse form of the name was just Sandr which means "sand beach". The first element lille which means "little" was added after the founding of Kristiansand in 1641 to distinguish it from the greater and more important town nearby.

Coat of arms
The coat of arms was granted on 11 September 1987. The official blazon is "Azure, three anchors argent in pall annulets conjoined". This means the arms have a blue field (background) and the charge is three anchors. The anchors have a tincture of argent which means it is commonly colored white, but if it is made out of metal, then silver is used. The blue color in the field and the anchors were chosen to symbolize the connection that the municipality has with the sea. There are three anchors to symbolize the three smaller municipalities that were merged in 1964 to form the present municipality. The arms were designed by Daniel Rike.

The previous coat of arms for Lillesand was approved on 15 December 1954 and in use until 10 September 1987. The blazon was "Azure, an anchor under a tern volant argent". This means the arms have a blue field (background) and the charge is an anchor with a arctic tern flying above it. The anchor and tern have a tincture of argent which means it is commonly colored white, but if it is made out of metal, then silver is used. Both symbols refer to the long coastline of the municipality and the importance of fishing and shipping for the local economy.. The arms were designed by Jens T. Thommasen and Kjell Westermark Mørch.

History
Sanden, which consisted of the small area near the harbor, was the original name for the municipality of Lillesand. Lillesand is built on the ancient estate of Lofthus. Christian Jensen Lofthuus was captured on his Lofthus estate around 1780.

In 1821, when Lillesand became a privileged port, it had a population of only 300 and had nine shipyards. By 1895 the merchant fleet was 95 vessels strong. But the death of the sailing ship caused severe economic difficulties for Lillesand. Sailing ships had been inexpensive and could be built from local timber. Steamers were built of steel, were expensive and required more capital than locals could muster. Shipyards were closed. Many of the residents emigrated from there to the United States. Lillesand remained a fishing village, though even this area suffered when the herring left the coast.

The Saltholmen Lighthouse, located on an island off Lillesand, is a nineteenth century lighthouse with a slate roof and a concrete tower for the light. It operated as a manned lighthouse from 1882 to 1952. Saltholmen (lit. "Salty Islet") is named after the salt extraction industry once there, established by Hans Nielsen Hauge.

The Lillesand-Flaksvandbanen operated between Lillesand and Flaksvann from 1896 to 1953.

, a Polish submarine, sank the German troopship  on 8 April 1940 off Lillesand. Rio de Janeiro was on its way to take part in the initial landings of Operation Weserübung the next day, the invasion of Norway.

Geography
Lillesand is bordered in the north by Birkenes municipality, to the east by Grimstad municipality and to the south by Kristiansand municipality. The lake Østre Grimevann is a large lake in the northern part of the municipality and the river Tovdalselva runs through the municipality, too. The Blindleia is an inland waterway that starts in Gamle Hellesund in Høvåg near Kristiansand in southern Norway, and continues past Lillesand. It is a salt water passage protected from the open sea by the offshore archipelago. The island of Justøy lies just south of the town of Lillesand, along the Blindleia. The Kvåsefjorden lies along the southwestern border of Lillesand municipality.

Navigation through the Blindleia passage requires attention to detail, but is not difficult as there are no tides, and very little current. The minimal tidal change in the skerries is due to its geographical location; the tidal flow that comes in from the Atlantic Ocean splits on the British Isles. One tidal stream goes through the English Channel, while the other goes around the north of the British Isles. The stream of the English Channel reaches the coast of Norway before the wave traveling around the British Islands. These two tidal "waves" are completely out of phase when they meet here, neutralizing the tidal effect.

Gallery

Government
All municipalities in Norway, including Lillesand, are responsible for primary education (through 10th grade), outpatient health services, senior citizen services, unemployment and other social services, zoning, economic development, and municipal roads. The municipality is governed by a municipal council of elected representatives, which in turn elect a mayor. The municipality falls under the Agder District Court and the Agder Court of Appeal.

Municipal council
The municipal council of Lillesand is made up of 27 representatives that are elected to four year terms. Currently, the party breakdown is as follows:

Attractions

The Norwegian National Park Skjærgårdsparken lies between Risør and Lillesand. Skjærgårdsparken, "the Park of Archipelago" is a paradise of islands, skerries, and rocks. Blindleia is a 12 kilometers Inland waterway between Lillesand and Ulvøysund with much small boat traffic in the summertime. The village of Brekkestø is tourist area on the island of Justøya.

Lillesand Town- and Maritime Museum is a local, culture historic museum, located in the centre of the town. The museum is also called Carl Knudsen-gården.

The Norwegian author Jostein Gaarder refers to this town in several of his books, for example in Sophie's World, where  The Solitaire Mystery refers to Lillesand.

Churches
Lillesand Church is a wooden church which was built in 1887–1889 in Gothic Revival/Swiss style. The architect was Henrik Thrap-Meyer who also designed the pulpit, altarpiece and baptismal font. The altarpiece was done by Abraham Tønnessen. Lillesand Church is perched high above the city on a hill at Kirkeheia.

In the current Lillesand municipality are also the medieval stone churches Vestre Moland Church and Høvåg Church, both of which are listed cultural heritage sites.

International relations

Twin towns — Sister cities
Lillesand has sister city agreements with the following places:
  Kalundborg, Region Sjælland, Denmark
  Kimitoön, Southwest Finland, Finland
  Nynäshamn, Stockholm County, Sweden

Notable residents

 Christian Jensen Lofthuus (1750-1797) owner of Lofthus farm, leader of the peasant revolt Lofthusreisingen, commemorated with a monument at the harbour in Lillesand
 Mads Langaard (1815 in Lillesand – 1891) a brewery owner, founded Frydenlunds bryggeri, now a division of Ringnes
 N. O. Nelson (1844 in Lillesand – 1922) founded N. O. Nelson Manufacturing Company in St. Louis, Missouri, and founded the village of LeClaire as a model company town.
 Knut Hamsun (1859–1952) writer and winner of the Nobel Prize in Literature bought Nørholm, a dilapidated manor house between Lillesand and Grimstad where he lived and worked
 Gabriel Scott (1874-1958) a Norwegian poet, novelist, playwright and children's writer; brought up in Høvåg
 Mathis Mathisen (born 1937 in Lillesand) a teacher, novelist, playwright and children's writer
 Liv Stoveland (born 1965 in Lillesand) a Norwegian soprano and singing teacher
 Jorunn Gleditsch Lossius (born 1980) a politician and deputy Mayor of Lillesand
 Jan Trygve Røyneland (born 1981 in Lillesand) a TV and film writer 
 Sophie's World (written in 1991) by Norwegian writer Jostein Gaarder is a novel about Sophie Amundsen, a 14-year-old girl who lives in Lillesand
 Heroes & Zeros (formed in 2003) a rock band from Lillesand, lead singer Hans Jørgen Undelstvedt

References

External links

Municipal fact sheet from Statistics Norway 

Municipal website 
Lillesand on www.visitnorway.com 
Welcome to Lillesand Municipality Lillesand Municipality 
The Sailors of Lillesand 
Lillesands-Posten, local newspaper, homepage

 
Kristiansand region
Municipalities of Agder
1838 establishments in Norway